Angry Birds Stella is a Finnish computer-animated adventure television series based on the whole all-device mobile game Angry Birds: Slingshot Stella produced by Rovio Entertainment. The first episode, "A Fork in the Friendship", aired on Toons.TV on November 1, 2014. The series ended on March 11, 2016.

Overview 
The series recounts the tale of young Stella, along with her friends Luca, a builder; Willow, a creative painter and artist with work of art; Poppy, a crazily loud drummer; and Dahlia, a scientist, a total brain, and an inventor as they struggle to contain Gale, the former friend of Stella, that is the queen of the minion pigs in Golden Island.

Characters

Main characters
Stella, a pink galah – The de facto leader of the flock, Stella is described as adventurous, fierce, friendly, courageous, and bold. Despite being very upset with her former friend Gale for the latter's departure and betrayal in the name of vanity, she still considers Gale a friend.
Dahlia, a brownish long-eared owl – The brains of the whole flock, a smart inventing genius and the oldest. However, some of her inventions may backfire.
Luca, a sky blue scrub-jay – The youngest and the only male in the flock. He is very playful and imaginative, and, unlike the others, has little to no ill-will towards Gale after the latter left the flock, as he is almost always happy to see her.
Poppy, a light yellow Cockatiel – Loud and boisterous, Poppy has a fondness for music, but the amount of noise she makes from her percussion often irks her friends instead, as Poppy frequently enjoys herself to the point she is unaware of the racket she makes. She also occasionally pulls pranks on her friends, much to their annoyance.
Willow, a dark blue western crowned pigeon with feathers resembling dreadlocks (most of which are concealed underneath her signature striped, floppy hat) – Though very shy and insecure, she is a very talented artist and specializes in painting portraits. Willow is also Luca's older sister.
 Gale, a dark purple violet-backed starling, also known as the Bad Princess – A selfish and extremely vain bird, formerly one of the flock and was once a close friend of Stella. She left the flock after discovering that, unlike her friends, the pigs were willing to have her as their queen without question and will answer her every whim. Despite leaving the flock, Gale remains highly motivated to keep the attention of her former friends, which often comes into direct conflict with her superiority complex. In the series finale, Gale finally reconciles with Stella.

Supporting characters
 Handsome Pig, a pig with a blond wig who has an unrequited crush on Gale and will do anything to impress her.
 Minion Pigs, pigs who are assistants of Gale, but often act completely witless.
 Artist Pig, the pig whom Gale hires to make paintings for her (though his art skills are not to her liking). He later becomes friends with Willow.

Episodes

Home media
Sony Pictures Home Entertainment is the DVD distributor for the series.
 Angry Birds Stella: The Complete 1st Season (December 1, 2015)
 Angry Birds Stella: The Complete 2nd Season (March 1, 2016)

References

Angry Birds television series
2014 Finnish television series debuts
2016 Finnish television series endings
2010s Finnish television series
Finnish children's animated adventure television series
Finnish children's animated comedy television series
Finnish children's animated drama television series
Computer-animated television series
KidsClick
Television series by Rovio Entertainment
Animated television series spinoffs
Animated television series about birds
Animated television series without speech